The Beylik of Bafra was one of the Beyliks of Canik, a group of small Turkmen principalities in northern Anatolia during the 14th and 15th centuries.

In 1460 the beylik of Bafra became a part of the Ottoman Empire.

See also
Anatolian beyliks
Beyliks of Canik

References

Anatolian beyliks
States in medieval Anatolia
History of Samsun Province
1460 disestablishments in Asia